Kuyaba ( Kūyāba) was one of the three centers of the Rus or  Saqaliba (early East Slavs) described in a lost book by Abu Zayd al-Balkhi (dating from ca. 920) and mentioned in works by some of his followers (Ibn Hawqal, Al-Istakhri, Hudud ul-'alam).
The two other centers were Slawiya ( Ṣ(a)lāwiya) (tentatively identified with the land of Ilmen Slavs, see Rus' Khaganate) and Arthaniya ( ’Arṯāniya) (not properly explained).

Soviet historians such as Boris Grekov and Boris Rybakov hypothesized that "Kuyaba" was a mispronunciation of "Kyiv". They theorized that Kuyaba had been a union of Slavic tribes in the middle course of the Dnieper River centered on Kyiv (now in Ukraine). 
Kuyaba, Slawiya, and Artaniya later merged to form the state of Kyivan Rus, believed to include modern Belarus, Russia and Ukraine. This explanation has been adopted by modern Ukrainian historiography.

See also
Kyi, the legendary founder of Kyiv
Kuyavia, Kuyavian-Pomeranian Voivodeship
Rus' Khaganate

References 

Kievan Rus'